Ilias bej Vrioni (1 January 1882 – 12 March 1932) was an Albanian politician and landowner. He was one of the signatories of the Albanian Declaration of Independence and served as Prime Minister of Albania three times.

Biography 

Ilias Vrioni was born in 1882 in Berat, in the Janina Vilayet of the Ottoman Empire to Mehmet Ali Pasha of the Vrioni family and Hysnije Vokopola of the Vokopola family. His household had great chifliks in the surroundings of Berat, Fier, and in the Myzeqe plain. His father was a high dignitary of the administration of the Ottoman Empire and collaborator of Abdyl Frashëri at the time of the Congress of Berlin, his mother came from a local landowning family that had their chifliks in the surroundings of Vokopolë.

He was one of the signatories of the Albanian Declaration of Independence in 1912. He served three times as Prime Minister and five times as Minister of Foreign Affairs. He died in Paris in 1932, while serving his second mandate as the Plenipotentiary Minister of the Kingdom of Albania to Paris and London.

He was decorated in 1920s with the order of Grand officier de la Légion d'honneur of the French Republic.

Political Activity 

 Prime Minister of Albania: 19 November 1920 – 1 July 1921
 Prime Minister of Albania: 11 July 1921 – 16 October 1921
 Minister of Foreign Affairs of Albania: 30 Mars 1924 – 27 May 1924
 Prime Minister of Albania and Minister of Foreign Affairs: 24 December 1924 – 5 January 1925
 Minister of Foreign Affairs of Albania: 12 February 1927 – 21 October 1927
 Minister of Foreign Affairs of Albania and Vice-Minister of Justice: 26 October 1927 – 21 May 1928
 Minister of Foreign Affairs of Albania: 11 May 1928 – 1 September 1928
 Minister of Foreign Affairs of Albania: 5 September 1928 – 13 January 1929
 Plenipotentiary Minister of Albania in Paris and London: 1925 – 1926
 Plenipotentiary Minister of Albania in Paris and London: 1929 – 1932

See also

 Omar Pasha Vrioni II
 Sami Bey Vrioni

References

See also
 History of Albania
 List of prime ministers of Albania

1882 births
1932 deaths
People from Berat
People from Janina vilayet
Albanian Sunni Muslims
Government ministers of Albania
Prime Ministers of Albania
Signatories of the Albanian Declaration of Independence
Civil servants from the Ottoman Empire
Ilias
Ambassadors of Albania to France
Ambassadors of Albania to the United Kingdom
All-Albanian Congress delegates
Grand Officiers of the Légion d'honneur
Mekteb-i Mülkiye alumni